The San Sebastián Street Festival is a Puerto Rican festival that takes place in the Old San Juan, in honor of Saint Sebastian, celebrated by the Catholic Church on January 20. The event starts the third Thursday of January through Sunday with an attendance of more than 200,000 people, making this activity recognized internationally. The celebration has been introduced in Florida and Texas in the 2010s.

History 

The festival was firstly organized by father Juan Manuel Madrazo, the priest of the San José Church in the 1950s, with the purpose to commemorate the life of the Saint and to raise money to repair the church. When Madrazo was transferred out of San Juan the festival was no longer organized, although, in 1970 the historian and anthropologist Ricardo Alegría proposed to Rafaela Balladares de Brito, a resident of San Sebastian street, to revive this tradition. Since then, with the help of her neighbors, the festival was organized again to collect money for an elementary school directed by Sisters of Charity.

The festival today

In Puerto Rico 
In the present, artisans' work acquired more importance, as well as musical and choreographic performances occurring in different stages around the Old San Juan. “Cabezudos” now include characters representing the Puerto Rican folklore that traverse the streets dancing and singing followed by the public. The municipality of San Juan is responsible in organizing the entire festival, which duration has been extended to four days.

In the United States 
In the recent years, the San Sebastián Festival has been celebrated in different areas of Florida and in DFW, Texas, for one or two days. This has been a result of many Puerto Ricans moving to the United States and wanting to maintain a connection with their typical island traditions. In 2021, due to the COVID-19 pandemic, the event will be virtual for the first time, and all events will be integrated into one.   The festivals are characterized by the presence of “Cabezudos” as well as the Puerto Rican artisan market, and it variety of food and rums and more than 6,000 persons participate.

References 

1950s establishments in Puerto Rico
Festivals established in the 1950s
Patronal festivals in Puerto Rico
Pages with unreviewed translations
Saint Sebastian